Louis Bisson Bridge spans the Rivière des Prairies between the eastern tip of Montreal's Pierrefonds-Roxboro borough and the district of Chomedey in Laval, Quebec, Canada. It carries 7 lanes of Quebec Highway 13, including one reversible lane at the centre. That lane is an example of a permanent zipper lane.

The bridge was named after Canadian aviator Louis Bisson.

See also

 List of bridges in Canada
 List of bridges spanning the Rivière des Prairies
 List of crossings of the Rivière des Prairies

References

Bridges in Montreal
Rivière des Prairies
Bisson
Pierrefonds-Roxboro
Road bridges in Quebec